Tapinoma flavidum is a species of ant in the genus Tapinoma. Described by André in 1892, the species is endemic to Borneo.

References

Tapinoma
Hymenoptera of Asia
Insects of Borneo
Insects described in 1892